The Indian Journal of Gastroenterology is a peer-reviewed bimonthly medical journal covering gastroenterology. It is published by the Indian Society of Gastroenterology and is indexed and abstracted in Index Medicus, MEDLINE, and Excerpta Medica.

The journal was established in 1982. Past editors-in-chief include F.P. Antia, S.R. Naik, and Philip Abraham. The journal publishes Editorials, Original Articles, Review Articles, Short Reports, Clinical Case Reports, Case Snippets, Debates and Letters.

References

External links 
 

Publications established in 1982
English-language journals
Open access journals
Gastroenterology and hepatology journals
Bimonthly journals
1982 establishments in India